McCoo is a surname. Notable people with the surname include:

Eric McCoo (born 1980), American football player
Marilyn McCoo (born 1943), American singer

See also
McCool